Giuseppe Carnevale (born 29 June 1978) is an Italian footballer.

External links

1978 births
Living people
Italian footballers
Stuttgarter Kickers players
2. Bundesliga players
Footballers from Stuttgart
FC Nöttingen players
Association football forwards